Stéphane Guillaume (born February 9, 1984) is a Haitian former professional footballer who played as a defender. He spent most of his career playing in the MLS. At international level, he represented the Haiti national team.

Career

Club
Guillaume began his professional career with Aigle Noir AC in Ligue Haïtienne, before moving to MLS team Colorado Rapids in 2005. However, Guillaume was unable to play due to regulatory matters, and moved to Miami FC for its inaugural season in February 2006. He played in Miami for two years then He had a big right knee surgery which kept him out of the field for the 2008 season.

He signed with Cleveland City Stars on May 16, 2009, and made his debut for the team the same day, against Minnesota Thunder.

Guillaume returned to the United States in 2013, signing professional terms with Fort Lauderdale Strikers on March 29, 2013.

International
Guillaume played for all the youth Haitian teams U-17, while playing for U-20 and U-23 teams Stephane was also playing for the major Haitian national team in a February 2003 friendly match against Peru. Guillaume was part of the Haiti team which won the 2007 Caribbean Nations Cup, and was in the Haiti squad at the 2007 CONCACAF Gold Cup.

Honours
 Caribbean Nations Cup: 2007

References

External links
 

Living people
1984 births
People from Saint-Marc
Association football defenders
Haitian footballers
Haitian expatriate footballers
Haiti international footballers
Colorado Rapids players
Miami FC (2006) players
Cleveland City Stars players
Fort Lauderdale Strikers players
Ligue Haïtienne players
USL First Division players
North American Soccer League players
2007 CONCACAF Gold Cup players
Expatriate soccer players in the United States